Liptako is a historic region in West Africa which included parts of modern-day Burkina Faso, Niger, and Mali. Control of the area changed hands between several regional ethnic groups, before the Gurma people established the kingdom of Koala. In the early 19th century, they were in turn overthrown by the Fula. Although a second kingdom of Koala was established to the south of the first, it never reclaimed significant regional power.

The Fula established Liptako as an Islamic state and an emirate of the Sokoto Caliphate. The emir of Liptako was its ruler until the French colonial occupation began in 1897, but retained political power until the position was dissolved by the post-colonial Upper Volta government in 1963. The emir now serves as a tribal chief on a more local scale.

Early history 
Information about the early history of the region that would become Liptako is scant, and no dates or records of rulership are known to exist. The area is believed to have changed hands between various ethnic groups, including the Dogon, the Kurumba, and possibly also the Bambara, Bissa, and Mossi.

Beginning in the late 15th century, the region was ruled by the Songhai as part of their empire. According to the Tarikh al-Sudan, the first king of the Songhai Empire, Sonni Ali died during an expedition in the area in 1492. The chronicle later names Arbinda-Farma Bokar, a son of a daughter of Askia Mohammad I, as having influence in the region in 1549–1550, but does not ascribe any particular title to him. After the collapse of the Songhai Empire in 1591, the Kurumba probably reestablished control over the region.

Kings of Koala 
Around 1718, the Gurma people took control of the area from the Kurumba. Balibagini, a member of a cadet branch of the royal family of Nungu, established the first kingdom of Koala, taking the title bedo (pl. bediba). The community that served as the capital, also named Koala, was not the present-day town of that name, but a now-lost settlement in the west of the Liptako region. In establishing his kingdom, Balibagini warred with the Kurumba, pushing them west toward Aribinda, and with the Fula, who were forbidden from the new kingdom. When his brother, Udan Jari, died, Balibagini annexed the territory he had controlled as well. The territory he carved out was larger than later Liptako, stretching as far east as the Niger River.

Paamba, the fifth bedo, lifted Balibagini's edict prohibiting a Fula presence in Koala, setting the stage for the kingdom's eventual fall. During the reign of the eighth king, Yencaari, a dispute over inheritance and taxation in the Fula village of Selbo escalated a rebellion that ultimately forced the Gurma to flee to the south. Yencaari was killed during the conflict, with one local account suggesting that he was injured in battle, succumbing to his wounds in Bani after the Gurma exodus. Yencaari's son and heir-apparent, Umaru, was also either killed or disgraced in battle, although he may have led the Gurma south after their defeat.

After a brief period of political turmoil, a survivor of the Koala ruling family, Kalinkuma, established a new town of Koala (at its present location) as the capital of a second kingdom of that name. Although the title of bedo was retained by the local traditional ruler even after the French occupation of the region, this second kingdom occupied a substantially smaller territory and had relatively little regional influence.

Family tree 

 Foarimo
 Udan Jari
  I. Balibagini
  III. Alfa
  VII. Baalisongi
  VIII. Yencaari
 Umaru
  IX. Yencabri
 Dakisi
  XIII. Yentugri
  IV. Koro
  V. Paamba
  X. Kalinkuma
  XI. Yenbuado
  XVII. Yenkuaga
 Beejieri
  XVIII. Labdidiedo
 Jafuuru
  XVI. Yenhamma
  XIX. Yenkpaari
 Hunhambiri
  XX. Yempaabu
  VI. Yembrima
  XII. Yensombu
 Sagiba
  XV. Yencirima
  II. Baadindiye
 Gmayiookan
  XIV. Lansongi

Emirs of Liptako 
Some members of the traditionally pastoral Fula people began to settle in the Liptako area as early as the 15th century. In the early 19th century, escalating tensions between the Islamized Fula and the ruling Gurma led to a jihad, inspired by Usman dan Fodio and the Fulani War. This conflict destroyed Koala, largely pushed the Gurma out of the region, and established Fula rule. The newly-established Liptako was not fully independent, but rather an emirate of the Sokoto Caliphate, administered through an intermediate suzerain in Gwandu. Nevertheless, distance and local sentiment permitted Liptako's emir considerable local control. The emirship was a hereditary office with a traditional order of succession defined by custom. The right of succession belonged to a male-descent child of the earliest surviving familial generation; within a generation, children of older brothers had precedence over the children of younger brothers, and older brothers were preferred over their younger siblings. However, not all successions passed strictly in this manner.

The French occupied the Liptako capital of Dori on 30 April 1897, during the reign of Bokari Sori, but did not remove the emir, and largely permitted the precolonial political system to continue. In 1963, Maurice Yaméogo, the first president of the independent Republic of Upper Volta, formally disbanded the emirate. Nassourou continued to use the title, which remained a source of significant local respect and political influence. Currently, the emir of Liptako serves as a tribal chief for the Fula in Séno Province.

Pretenders 
Following the death of Aamadu Iisa, a succession crisis occurred when Bokari Sori and Buhaari Iisa both claimed the emirship. In 1891, French military officer Parfait-Louis Monteil visited Liptako amidst the crisis and entered into a treaty with Buhaari's son Boubakar, believing Buhaari to be the eventual next emir. In 1895, colonial administrator Georges Destenave traveled to Liptako as part of an effort to confirm the status of French treaties with various local authorities and was informed that Buhaari was dead, having never become emir.

After Nassourou Abdoulaye Dicko's death in 2010, representatives of the family selected the late emir's brother, Boubacar Bassirou Dicko, to succeed him in a ceremony on 10 December 2010. Four days later, a council of Liptako village chiefs elected Nassourou's son, Ousame Amirou Dicko, to the same office. The disputed succession was eventually resolved in favor of Ousame.

Family tree 
The emirs of Liptako claim descent from a semi-legendary migrant named Birmaari Saala Paate, who was said to have followed a wandering bull from Macina, in modern-day Mali, to Liptako.

 Birmaari Saala Paate
 Seydu
 Hamma Seydu
  II. Saalu Hamma Seydu
 Iisa
  V. Aamadu Iisa
  VII. Bokari Aamadu Iisa
  VIII. Abdurramaan Aamadu Iisa
 Buhaari Iisa
 Boubakar
  IV. Seeku Saalu
  III. Sori Hamma
  VI. Bokari Sori
  X. Usmaan Bokari Sori
  XI. Nassourou Abdoulaye Dicko
  XII. Ousmane Amirou Dicko
 Boubacar Bassirou Dicko
 Faaruuku
  IX. Abdullaahi Faaruuku
  I. Braahima Seydu

See also 
 List of colonial governors of French Upper Volta
 List of heads of state of Burkina Faso
 List of heads of state of Mali
 List of heads of state of Niger

Notes

References

Bibliography 
 
 
 
 
 
 
 
 

Rulers
Burkina Faso-related lists
French West Africa
Lists of African rulers
Liptako
Niger-related lists